The 1952 Miami Hurricanes football team represented the University of Miami as an independent during the 1952 college football season. Led by fifth-year head coach Andy Gustafson, the Hurricanes played their home games at Burdine Stadium in Miami, Florida. Miami finished the season 4–7.

Schedule

References

Miami
Miami Hurricanes football seasons
Miami Hurricanes football